James Dwight and Richard Sears defended their title against Alexander Van Rensselaer and Walter Berry in the final.

Draw

Finals

Earlier rounds

Section 1

Section 2

References 
 

Men's Doubles
U.S. National Championships (tennis) by year – Men's doubles